= Copeland Marks =

American cookbook writer (1921–1999)

Copeland Harris Marks (1921–1999) was the author of sixteen cookbooks. He specialized in researching and writing about regional cuisines around the world, including The Indonesian Kitchen (1981), False Tongues and Sunday Bread: A Guatemalan and Mayan Cookbook (1985) and The Great Book of Couscous (1994).

Marks was born in Burlington, Vermont, in 1921. He obtained a degree in agriculture from the University of Vermont, before serving in World War II, serving in the Burma Campaign. After the war he served for eight years in the Foreign Service, after which he opened an import-export business.

Marks lived for different periods in Mexico, Guatemala, India and South Africa. In his latter years he lived in Brooklyn Heights, and became a cooking author and lecturer.
